China National Highway 317 (G317) runs broadly west to east from Chengdu, Sichuan to Gar County, Ngari Prefecture, Tibet. It is 2,028 kilometres in length and forms an important transportation route in Tibet. As of 2017, Highway 317 passes through the highest vehicular tunnel in the world in the Chola Mountains of Dêgê County. Part of the route is concurrent with the Sichuan-Tibet Highway.

Route and distance

References

See also 
 China National Highways

Transport in Chengdu
Transport in Sichuan
Roads in Tibet
317